The Port Huron Predators were a professional Indoor Football team based in Port Huron, Michigan. The team was a member of the Continental Indoor Football League (CIFL). The Predators joined the CIFL in 2011 as an expansion team. The Predators were the second indoor football team to be based in Port Huron, the first being CIFL charter members and inaugural champions the Port Huron Pirates (2006–2007). The Owner of the Predators was Rachel Brusate. The Predators played their home games at the McMorran Arena.

Franchise history

2011 season

On February 26, 2011, the Predators won their first game in franchise history, with a 69–12 victory over the visiting Indianapolis Enforcers. They got off to a quick start after a brief scare and never looked back. After the Enforcers brought back the opening kick-off to the Predators nine yard line, the Port Huron defense stepped up and picked off the first play from scrimmage. It was the first of seven interceptions by the Predators' defense. On the next play, Predators back-up quarterback Jim Roth, who was filling in for Damon Dowdell, found Robert Height for a 41-yard score to put the team ahead for good. The Predators carried the 7–0 into the second quarter and led 21–6 at the half. In the second half, the flood gates opened as the Enforcers, a first-year team travel team, showed their inexperience with several mistakes. After several interceptions and fumbles, Port Huron took a commanding 47–6 lead into the third quarter before going on to win by the lopsided score. On March 28, the Predators fired their second coach of the season as well as their director of operations. Head Coach Jason Lovelock was let go after Brusate said, "The players wanted something different." As for Director of Operations, Julie Crankshaw, Brusate cited, "We had different ideas on what should be done. She was fired. She didn't live up to her contract; she didn't fulfill it. So there is no need to fulfill my end." Brusate appointed Offensive Coordinator, John Forti, as the Interim Head Coach. On April 2, Forti lead the team into his first game as Head Coach, and lead the team to a 29–45 defeat to the Chicago Knights, who hadn't won a game in over 2 seasons. The Predators announced on April 28, 2011 that they would be forfeiting the rest of the season.

Final roster

Head coaches
Note: Statistics are correct through the end of the 2011 Continental Indoor Football League season.

Season-by-season

|-
| colspan="6" style="text-align:center;"| Port Huron Predators (CIFL)
|-
|2011 || 2 || 8 || 0 || 5th || --
|-
!Totals || 2 || 8 || 0
|colspan="2"| (including playoffs)

References

External links
Port Huron Predators Official Website
Continental Indoor Football League Official Website

Former Continental Indoor Football League teams
American football teams in Michigan
Port Huron, Michigan
American football teams established in 2010
American football teams disestablished in 2011
2010 establishments in Michigan
2011 disestablishments in Michigan